Winsome Witch is an animated television series produced by Hanna-Barbera Productions which aired as a segment on The Atom Ant/Secret Squirrel Show from October 2, 1965 to September 7, 1967. The main character, Winsome "Winnie" W. Witch, has various adventures and casts spells on people; her travels on her magical broom take her all over the world.

Plot
Winnie (voiced by Jean Vander Pyl) is a friendly, yet somewhat inept witch. Her catch phrase when casting a spell was "Ippity-pippity-pow." When the magic spell is cast, the "Jet Screamer" entrance cue from The Jetsons is heard.

List of episodes

Season 1 (1965–66)

Season 2 (1966-67)

Voices
 Jean Vander Pyl - Winsome Witch

Other voices include Dick Beals, Mel Blanc, Henry Corden, Allan Melvin, John Stephenson, and Janet Waldo.

Home video
Worldvision Home Video released Winsome Witch on VHS tape in the 1980s. It featured eight episodes from the series. It was later re-released by GoodTimes Home Video (under the Kids Klassics label). Both releases have since gone out of print.

The episode "Prince of a Pup" is available on the DVD Saturday Morning Cartoons 1960's Vol. 1.

All the Winsome Witch episodes were included in The Secret Squirrel Show: The Complete Series, available on DVD and on iTunes.

Other appearances
Winsome Witch appeared in the "Fender Bender 500" segment of Wake, Rattle, and Roll. She is shown to have a cat named Lucky (vocal effects provided by Don Messick) as her driving partner and she drives a cauldron-modeled monster truck called the Sonic Broom, which also has on it a talking skeleton named Axel (voiced by Neil Ross).

Winsome Witch appears in the Wacky Races episode "Little Pink Riding Hood", voiced by Nicole Parker.

Winsome Witch appears in Jellystone!, voiced by Lesley Nicol. She now has a British accent. Winsome Witch works in the cafeteria at Jellystone Hospital. In "Face of the Town", she partook in a race in Jellystone to determine who would become the new face of Jellystone. Like the "Fender Bender 500", she has Axel on her car. The episode "Spell Book" reveals that Winsome Witch is responsible for using her magic to decorate Jellystone on Halloween and is shown to live near a haunted house.

References

External links
 Winsome Witch at the Big Cartoon DataBase

1960s American animated television series
1965 American television series debuts
1967 American television series endings
American children's animated fantasy television series
American children's animated horror television series
Fictional witches
Hanna-Barbera characters
Television series by Hanna-Barbera
Television series by Screen Gems
Television series by Sony Pictures Television
Television series by Warner Bros. Television Studios
Television series about witchcraft
NBC original programming